Phil Price (born September 1, 1949) is a retired Canadian football player who played for the Montreal Alouettes, Saskatchewan Roughriders and Edmonton Eskimos. He played college football at Idaho State University.

References

1949 births
Living people
Idaho State Bengals football players
Edmonton Elks players
Saskatchewan Roughriders players
Montreal Alouettes players
Sportspeople from Providence, Rhode Island
Players of American football from Providence, Rhode Island